Sir Arthur Page, QC (9 March 1876 – 1 September 1958) was a British barrister, judge, and jeu de paume player and cricketer who served as Chief Justice of the High Court of Judicature at Rangoon. He played jeu de paume at the 1908 Summer Olympics and was also a first-class cricketer.

He was a member of the Harrow School cricket team, played jeu de paume while attending Magdalen College, Oxford. A member of the Inner Temple, he was an attempted candidate in the 1910 United Kingdom general election for the Conservative Party in Derby, and served as a judge in Calcutta and Burma, where he was Chief Justice. He was appointed a KC in 1922.

During the Second World War, Page was Chairman of the Evidence Section, Blockade Intelligence, Ministry of Economic Warfare between 1939 and 1940 and Chairman of the North Staffordshire Regional Coal Valuation Board from 1941.

His son was the Conservative politician Sir John Page.

References

1876 births
1958 deaths
People educated at Harrow School
Alumni of Magdalen College, Oxford
Members of the Inner Temple
English King's Counsel
Free Foresters cricketers
Jeu de paume players at the 1908 Summer Olympics
Olympic real tennis players of Great Britain
English real tennis players
English cricketers
People from Hildenborough
Conservative Party (UK) parliamentary candidates
Chief justices
British sportsperson-politicians
Oxford University cricketers
Marylebone Cricket Club cricketers
A. J. Webbe's XI cricketers
British Burma judges
Judges of the Calcutta High Court
Royal Naval Volunteer Reserve personnel of World War I
Royal Marines officers
Royal Marines personnel of World War I
Ministry of Economic Warfare